Redwood is an unincorporated community in Franklin County, Virginia, United States. Redwood has a post office with ZIP code 24146, which opened on August 9, 1880. zip is incorrect 24092

References

Unincorporated communities in Franklin County, Virginia
Unincorporated communities in Virginia